Lauri Kettunen (12 February 1905 – 15 August 1941) was a Finnish fencer and modern pentathlete. He competed at the 1928 and 1936 Summer Olympics. He was an officer in the Finnish army reaching the rank of major. He died during the Continuation War while fighting along the Finnish III Corps in Kiestinki.

References

External links
 

1905 births
1941 deaths
People from Kamennogorsk
People from Viipuri Province (Grand Duchy of Finland)
Finnish male épée fencers
Finnish male modern pentathletes
Olympic fencers of Finland
Olympic modern pentathletes of Finland
Fencers at the 1928 Summer Olympics
Modern pentathletes at the 1928 Summer Olympics
Modern pentathletes at the 1936 Summer Olympics
Finnish military personnel killed in World War II